FC Rijnvogels is a football club from Katwijk, Netherlands. FC Rijnvogels plays in the 2022–23 Saturday Derde Divisie.

History
In the 2016-2017 KNVB Cup it won against Groene Ster and AFC '34, then lost against Cambuur.

References

External links
 Official site

Football clubs in the Netherlands
Football clubs in Katwijk
Association football clubs established in 2004
2004 establishments in the Netherlands